Fenil Umrigar is an Indian actress who works in Hindi television. She is best known for her portrayal of Sanjana Roy in Best Friends Forever?, Pihu Kapoor Shergill in Bade Acche Lagte Hain, Gauri Jha Chaudhary in Kaala Teeka and Pankhuri Mishra in Rajaa Betaa.

Early life
Umrigar was born and brought up in Surat, Gujarat.

Career
Umrigar made her acting debut with Maryada: Lekin Kab Tak? and went onto portray crucial roles in Dil Se Di Dua... Saubhagyavati Bhava? and Madhubala – Ek Ishq Ek Junoon.

She also appeared in episodic roles in Yeh Hai Aashiqui, Love by Chance, Gumrah: End of Innocence, Pyaar Tune Kya Kiya and Laal Ishq.

Umrigar is best known for her lead portrayal of Sanjana "Sanju" Roy in Best Friends Forever?, Pihu Kapoor Shergill in Bade Achhe Lagte Hain and Dhurmona/Sridevi in Yam Hain Hum.

She also portrayed the negative lead of Gauri Jha Chaudhary in Kaala Teeka and Pankhuri Mishra in Rajaa Betaa. In 2021, she appeared in the music video "Saukha Nayio Mileya".

Since August 2022, she is seen portraying Sonam Goyal in Saavi Ki Savaari.

Filmography

Television

Music videos

See also
 List of Indian television actresses

References

External links 

Living people
1993 births
Parsi people
Indian television actresses
Actresses in Hindi television
Actresses from Gujarat
21st-century Indian actresses
Actresses in Hindi cinema
Indian film actresses
Indian soap opera actresses